Carlos Francis (born January 3, 1981, in Fort Worth, Texas) is an American football player who played wide receiver for the Oakland Raiders. At Texas Tech, he started in 38 of 49 contests he played in and hauled in 216 passes for 3,031 yards (14.0 avg) and 21 touchdowns. He was drafted in the 2004 NFL Draft by the Raiders. Francis was released in 2007.

Francis attended Southwest High School in Fort Worth, Texas and was a letterman in football and track.

Francis now coaches football, track, and basketball at The Oakridge School in Arlington, Texas.

Track and field

Personal bests

References

1981 births
Living people
Sportspeople from Fort Worth, Texas
American football wide receivers
Texas Tech Red Raiders football players
Oakland Raiders players